Baldo Santana Martínez (born 25 May 1995) is a Spanish footballer who plays for CD Toledo B. Mainly a central defender, he can also play as a right back.

Club career
Born in Alicante, Baldo joined Hércules CF's youth setup in 2007, after starting it out at local clubs CD El Cabo and Alicante CF. In the 2009 summer he moved to Valencia CF, being assigned to the youth squads, but moved back to the Blanquiazules two years later.

On 17 August 2013, while still a junior, Baldo played his first match as a professional, coming on as a late substitute for Gai Assulin in a 1–1 home draw against Real Zaragoza. On 12 July of the following year he signed a two-year deal with the club, being definitely promoted to the main squad now in Segunda División B.

References

External links

1995 births
Living people
Footballers from Alicante
Spanish footballers
Association football defenders
Segunda División players
Segunda División B players
Tercera División players
Hércules CF B players
Hércules CF players